Omar Alberto Mendoza Cardona (born 25 November 1989 in Lejanías) is a Colombian cyclist, who currently rides for UCI Continental team .

Major results
2014
2nd Time trial, National Road Championships
2015
1st Overall Clásico RCN
1st Stage 2
2017
1st Stage 2 Volta Internacional Cova da Beira
2018
6th Overall Vuelta a San Juan
2021
5th Time trial, National Road Championships
2022
6th Time trial, National Road Championships

References

External links

1989 births
Living people
Colombian male cyclists
People from Meta Department
21st-century Colombian people